The IFSC Climbing Asian Youth Championships are Asian youth championships for competition climbing organized by the International Federation of Sport Climbing (IFSC).

There are three age groups: Juniors (18–19 years old), Youth A (16–17 years old), and Youth B (14–15 years old).

Championships

Boys results

Lead

Juniors

Youth A

Youth B

Speed

Juniors

Youth A

Youth B

Bouldering

Juniors

Youth A

Youth B

Girls results

Lead

Juniors

Youth A

Youth B

Speed

Juniors

Youth A

Youth B

Bouldering

Juniors

Youth A

Youth B

References

External links 
 Calendar of IFSC competitions

Climbing competitions